Ctenusa is a genus of moths of the family Noctuidae.

Species
Ctenusa curvilinea Hampson, 1913
Ctenusa pallida Hampson, 1902
Ctenusa varians Wallengren, 1863

References
Natural History Museum Lepidoptera genus database

Catocalinae
Moth genera